The Aiguille du Croissant is a minor summit in the Grand Combin massif in the Pennine Alps, Switzerland. Because of its small prominence it was included in the enlarged list of alpine four-thousanders.

See also
Swisstopo maps

References

External links 
List of Alpine four-thousanders

Alpine four-thousanders
Mountains of the Alps
Mountains of Valais
Pennine Alps
Mountains of Switzerland
Four-thousanders of Switzerland